Gerry Rinaldi (born 25 June 1945) is a Canadian retired alpine skier who competed in the 1968 Winter Olympics.

References

1945 births
Living people
Canadian male alpine skiers
Olympic alpine skiers of Canada
Alpine skiers at the 1968 Winter Olympics